Avenir Social may refer to:

 AvenirSocial, a Swiss labor union
 L'Avenir Social, a French anarchist orphanage (1906–1922)
 L'Avenir Social (newspaper), the newspaper of the Belgian Labour Party